Juan Quartarone Carbone (28 May 1935 – 23 November 2015) was an Argentine football midfielder.

Nickname El Brujo (The Wizard) he played in Argentina and El Salvador. After retiring as a player, he coached a number of teams in El Salvador and the El Salvador national team.

Juan Quartarone died on 23 November 2015.

Achievements

References

External links
Juan Quarterone at BDFA.com.ar 
 

1935 births
2015 deaths
Argentine footballers
Racing Club de Avellaneda footballers
Quilmes Atlético Club footballers
Club Atlético Huracán footballers
Club Atlético Platense footballers
San Luis de Quillota footballers
C.S.D. Municipal players
Expatriate footballers in El Salvador
Expatriate footballers in Guatemala
Expatriate footballers in Chile
Argentine football managers
Expatriate football managers in El Salvador
El Salvador national football team managers
Place of birth missing
C.D. FAS managers
C.D. Luis Ángel Firpo managers
C.D. Águila managers
Aurora F.C. managers
Association football midfielders